Wild One, Wild Ones, The Wild One or The Wild Ones   may refer to:

Film
 The Wild One, 1953 film starring Marlon Brando
 The Wild One (2022 film) based on the life of James Morrill, a mid-19th century British castaway in Australia
 The Wild Ones (film), 2012 Spanish film

Literature
 Wild Ones (manga), a 2004 manga by Kiyo Fujiwara
 The Wild One (novel), a 1967 children's novel by Monica Edwards
Wild Ones: A Sometimes Dismaying, Weirdly Reassuring Story About Looking at People Looking at Animals in America, a 2013 novel by Jon Mooallem

Music

Albums 
 Wild One (The Guess Who album), 1972
 Wild One: The Very Best of Thin Lizzy, an album by Thin Lizzy
 Wild One, by Rooney released November 2009
 The Wild One, an album by Sugarplum Fairy
 Wild Ones (Flo Rida album), a 2012 album by Flo Rida
 Wild Ones (Kip Moore album), a 2015 album by Kip Moore
Wild Ones, a 2013 album by Black Prairie (written as accompaniment to the book by Jon Mooallem)
 The Wild Ones (album), a 1982 album by the Cockney Rejects

Songs 
 "Wild One" (Bobby Rydell song), 1960
 "Wild One" (Faith Hill song), a country music song written by Pat Bunch, Jaime Kyle, and Will Rambeaux
 "Wild One" (Martha and the Vandellas song), 1964
 "Wild One" (Johnny O'Keefe song), also known as "Real Wild Child"
 "Wild One" (Green Day song), a song by Green Day from the 2012 album ¡Dos!
 "Wild One", a song by Dio from the album Lock Up the Wolves
 "Wild One", a song by Rooney released on an EP titled Wild One in 2009
 "Wild One", a song by Darius Rucker from Back to Then
 "Wild One", a song by Thin Lizzy from Fighting
 "Wild One", a song by Nikki Lane from All or Nothin'
 "The Wild One" (song), a 2008 song by the band Jet featuring Iggy Pop
 "The Wild One", a 1974 song by Suzi Quatro from Quatro
 "Wild Ones" (song), a 2011 single by Flo Rida featuring Sia
 "The Wild Ones" (song), a 1994 song by Suede
 "The Wild Ones", a 1980 song by Status Quo from the album Just Supposin'

Performers 
 The Wild Ones (band), a 1960s rock group
 "The Wild One", a nickname for Johnny O'Keefe

Other uses 
 The Wild One (roller coaster), a wooden roller coaster at Six Flags America
 Wild Ones (organization), a not-for-profit educational organization that promotes environmentally sound landscaping practices
 Wild Ones (video game), a former video game by Playdom